Kei Lun is an at-grade MTR  stop located at Tsing Lun Road in Tuen Mun District, near Kei Lun Wai. It opened on 18 September 1988 and belongs to Zone 3.

Unusually among Light Rail stops, northbound route 505 trains to  stop here, but southbound trains to  do not.

References

MTR Light Rail stops
Former Kowloon–Canton Railway stations
Tuen Mun District
Railway stations in Hong Kong opened in 1988
1988 establishments in Hong Kong